Zakhar Chervyakov (born 30 August 2002) is a Belarusian footballer, who plays for Vitebsk.

References

External links

2002 births
Living people
Sportspeople from Vitebsk
Belarusian footballers
Association football forwards
FC Vitebsk players